The Paul Bley Quartet is an album by Canadian jazz pianist Paul Bley recorded in 1987 and released on the ECM label.

Reception 
The Allmusic review by Thom Jurek awarded the album 4 stars, stating: "While it's easy to argue that, with Manfred Eicher's icy, crystalline production, this was a stock date for both the artists and the label, that argument would be flat wrong. Bley was looking for a new lyricism in his own playing and in his compositions. He was coming from a different place than the large harmonies offered by augmented and suspended chords and writing for piano trios. The other band members -- two other extremely lyrical improvisers in Surman and Frisell (who prized understatement as the veritable doorway to lyricism) and a drummer who was better known for his dancing through rhythms than playing them in Motian -- were the perfect foils."  The Penguin Guide to Jazz said "The long "Interplay" on the latter, eponymous set, is disappointing enough to ease that album back a stellar notch".

Track listing
 "Interplay" (Paul Bley) - 20:22 
 "Heat" (John Surman) - 8:18 
 "After Dark" (Bill Frisell) - 11:55 
 "One in Four" (Paul Motian) - 9:33 
 "Triste" (Paul Bley) - 2:58
Recorded at Rainbow Studio in Oslo, Norway, in November 1987.

Personnel
 Paul Bley — piano 
 John Surman — soprano saxophone, bass clarinet
 Bill Frisell — guitar
 Paul Motian — drums

References

ECM Records albums
Paul Bley albums
1987 albums